George Osborne Sayles  (21 April 1901 – 28 February 1994) was an English historian best known for his work on the medieval English law courts and the early English Parliaments.

Early life
G. O. Sayles was raised and educated in Derbyshire. He attended Ilkeston Grammar School. He studied at the University of Glasgow and then University College London.

Career

During his lifetime he held the following positions: Assistant in History, Glasgow University 1924-25, Lecturer 1925-34, Senior Lecturer 1934-45; Professor of Modern History, Queen's University Belfast 1945-53; Burnett-Fletcher Chair of History, University of Aberdeen 1953-62; Vice-President, Selden Society 1954-86; FBA 1962; Kenan Professor of History, New York University 1967-68.

His most important works were The King's Parliament of England (1974) and his work on the modern edition of the late thirteenth-century legal treatise known as Fleta published by the Selden Society in three volumes (of a projected four).

His longtime writing partner was Henry Gerald Richardson (d. 1974).

Personal life
In 1936 he married Agnes Sutherland, from Glasgow. They had a son (Michael) and daughter (Hilary).

Partial bibliography
The Medieval Foundations of England (1st edn, 1948)
The King's Parliament of England (1974) 

The Functions of the Medieval Parliament of England (1987) 
in collaboration with H.G. Richardson:
The Irish Parliament in the Middle Ages (1952)

The Administration of Ireland, 1172–1377 (1963)
The English Parliament in the Middle Ages (1981)

References

External links
 Selden Society, Publications

1901 births
1994 deaths
Academics of the University of Aberdeen
People from Ilkeston
Alumni of University College London
Alumni of the University of Glasgow
People educated at Ilkeston Academy
20th-century English historians
Fellows of the British Academy
Legal historians